Nisarg Patel (born  April 20, 1988) is an Indian-born American cricketer. In January 2018, he was named in the United States squad for the 2017–18 Regional Super50 tournament in the West Indies. He made his List A debut for the United States against the Leeward Islands in the 2017–18 Regional Super50 on January 31, 2018.

In November 2018, he was added to the United States' squad for the 2018 ICC World Cricket League Division Three tournament in Oman. In June 2019, he was named in a 30-man training squad for the United States cricket team, ahead of the Regional Finals of the 2018–19 ICC T20 World Cup Americas Qualifier tournament in Bermuda. The following month, he was one of twelve players to sign a three-month central contract with USA Cricket.

In August 2019, he was named in the United States' squad for the Regional Finals of the 2018–19 ICC T20 World Cup Americas Qualifier tournament. He made his Twenty20 International (T20I) debut for the United States against Bermuda on August 18, 2019. In September 2019, he was named in United States's One Day International (ODI) squad for the 2019 United States Tri-Nation Series. He made his ODI debut for the United States, against Papua New Guinea, on September 13, 2019.

In November 2019, he was named in the United States' squad for the 2019–20 Regional Super50 tournament. In November 2020, Patel's bowling action was deemed to be illegal by the International Cricket Council (ICC). In February 2021, he was cleared by the ICC to resume bowling in international matches. In June 2021, he was selected to take part in the Minor League Cricket tournament in the United States following the players' draft.

In October 2021, he was named in the American squad for the 2021 ICC Men's T20 World Cup Americas Qualifier tournament in Antigua.

References

External links
 

1988 births
Living people
American cricketers
United States One Day International cricketers
United States Twenty20 International cricketers
Cricketers from Ahmedabad
Indian emigrants to the United States
American sportspeople of Indian descent
American people of Gujarati descent